Solariella plakhus is a species of sea snail, a marine gastropod mollusk in the family Solariellidae.

Description

Distribution
This marine species occurs off Taiwan.

References

External links
  Vilvens, C. (2009). New species and new records of Solariellidae (Gastropoda: Trochoidea) from Indonesia and Taiwan. Novapex. 10 (3): 69-96

plakhus
Gastropods described in 2009